Anomocora is a genus of cnidarians belonging to the family Caryophylliidae.

The genus has almost cosmopolitan distribution.

Species

Species:

Anomocora carinata 
Anomocora exilis 
Anomocora fecunda

References

Caryophylliidae
Scleractinia genera